The Goodnight Show with Michael Essany is an American television talk show hosted by Michael Essany. The show's three episodes began streaming on Amazon Video in August 2017.

References

2010s American television talk shows
2017 American television series debuts
2010s American late-night television series
English-language television shows